Leavenheath is a village and civil parish located on the Essex - Suffolk border. Located on the A134 between Sudbury and Colchester, it is part of Babergh district. The parish also contains the hamlets of Cock Street and Honey Tye, and in 2001 had a population of 1,373, falling slightly to 1,370 at the 2011 Census.

The village was named after the Leaven Heath, an area of open land between Boxford, Bures, Nayland and Polstead. It does not have a village centre, but is separated into two parts around half a mile apart by Leaden Hall. The northern section is to the east of the A134, the southern section to the west. Such is the dispersed nature of the village, that it did not even have a church until St Matthew's was built, originally as a chapel of ease, in 1836, and was not designated as a parish until 1952; prior to that it was part of Stoke by Nayland Parish.

The south-eastern part of the parish is covered by the Dedham Vale AONB, whilst the south-west contains a section of the Arger Fen SSSI. In the east of the parish are The Carrs, a set of four ponds that feed the River Stour. Breach Grove and Leadenhall Woods are both designated nature reserves.

Governance
An electoral ward in the same name exists. This ward includes Assington and has a total population of 1772 at the 2011 Census.

Notable people
 Hannah Dodd (born 1995), actress

References

External links

Village website

Villages in Suffolk
Babergh District
Civil parishes in Suffolk